Martin Truex may refer to:

Martin Truex Sr. (born 1948), American racing driver
Martin Truex Jr. (born 1980), American racing driver and Monster Energy NASCAR Cup Series champion

See also
Truex